Kudeyevsky (Köźöy) is a rural locality (a selo) and the administrative centre of Kudeyevsky Selsoviet, Iglinsky District, Bashkortostan, Russia. The population was 3,091 as of 2010. There are 2 streets.

Geography 
Kudeyevsky is located 44 km east of Iglino (the district's administrative centre) by road. Kudeyevka is the nearest rural locality.

References 

Rural localities in Iglinsky District